Spirorbis borealis is a sedentary marine polychaete worm in the Serpulidae family. It is commonly called the sinistral spiral tubeworm and is the type species of the genus Spirorbis.

Polychaetes, or marine bristle worms, have elongated bodies divided into many segments. Each segment may bear setae (bristles) and parapodia (paddle-like appendages). Some species live freely, either swimming, crawling or burrowing, and these are known as "errant". Others live permanently in tubes, either calcareous or parchment-like, and these are known as "sedentary".

Description
S. borealis secretes a very small, unridged, off-white, calcareous tube. This is about five millimetres in diameter and forms a flat, clockwise spiral coil as seen from above. The worm retreats into its tube when above water but under water can be seen to have green tentacles.

Distribution and habitat
S. borealis is found on either side of the north Atlantic Ocean. This includes the coasts of Great Britain, Ireland, Spain and Portugal, Prince Edward Island, Newfoundland, the Gulf of St Lawrence and the St Lawrence estuary. 
It is typically found growing on Fucus, Laminaria and other seaweeds as well as on rocks and stones. It is widely distributed and abundant on the middle and lower shore, down to a depth of about thirty metres.

Biology
S. borealis is a hermaphrodite. The segments at the front of the abdomen are female while those at the back are male. The male and female gonads mature at much the same time but the sperm is usually released first. Fertilisation is external to the body but inside the tube. The larvae are free swimming member of the plankton for a short time. They then settle out. In a study, where fronds of Fucus serratus already colonised by adults were available for settling, the larvae avoided  the most densely populated areas and favoured the concave grooves on either side of the midribs. When prevented from settling out for eight hours, they were much less selective and settled on any Fucus surface regardless of the presence of adults.

References

Serpulidae
Animals described in 1800